Naziritor chelynoides, the dark mahseer, is a species of ray-finned fish in the genus Naziritor. It is found in India and Nepal.

References 

Fish described in 1839
Cyprinid fish of Asia
Taxobox binomials not recognized by IUCN